Cheetah was a wooden roller coaster by Custom Coasters International, located in the African Pridelands section of the Wild Adventures theme park, in Valdosta, Georgia.  The coaster was named after the cheetah, the fastest land animal, because of its top speed reaching 65 mph when the coaster first opened, but after years of friction and track deformation the coaster was recorded in 2009 reaching a top speed of 52 miles per hour. It has a standard out and back layout with five bunny hops and a figure-eight ending. Built in 2001, Cheetah was the largest roller coaster at Wild Adventures. In Wild Adventures off season between 2009 and 2010, the Cheetah was given a $1.3 million renovation by Martin & Vleminckx replacing the track on the figure-eight and smoothing out the rest of the track. In March 2020, Cheetah closed along with the rest of the park due to the COVID-19 pandemic. In June 2020, the park reopened, however without Cheetah operating. Wild Adventures cited being unable to achieve "adequate physical distancing." Access to the coaster was blocked by a wooden construction wall and the coaster's trains had been removed from the tracks. In January 2021, the park stated "The Cheetah roller coaster has been retired to make room for new and exciting changes in the coming years."

Ride experience 
Cheetah began with a -tall drop to a small  bunny hop, followed by a larger  bunny hop. It continues with a 35-degree decline into a helix. Cheetah's return journey starts with a  drop and two more  bunny hops. These lead into right turn flat helix, ending with a figure eight.

References 

Former roller coasters in Georgia (U.S. state)
Roller coasters introduced in 2001
Wild Adventures
Roller coasters operated by Herschend Family Entertainment